Trevor Squirrell is an American politician who has served in the Vermont House of Representatives since 2017.

References

Living people
State University of New York at Oswego alumni
Green Mountain College alumni
21st-century American politicians
Democratic Party members of the Vermont House of Representatives
British emigrants to the United States
Year of birth missing (living people)